ZFD could refer to:

 Farringdon station, London, England; National Rail station code ZFD
 Fond-du-Lac Airport, Saskatchewan, Canada; IATA airport code ZFD
 ZfD or ZFD: ZENworks for Desktops (in a Novell computer-networking environment)
 Zermelo–Fraenkel set theory with the axiom of determinacy